Raimondo della Torre (died 23 February 1299) was an Italian clergyman, who was patriarch of Aquileia from 1273 until his death. He was a member of the della Torre Guelph family.

Biography
He was the son of Pagano I della Torre, lord of Milan and Valsassina, and the brother of Napo della Torre. He was archpriest of Monza in 1251–1262, archbishop of Milan in 1261–1262 (though only namely), and bishop of Como from 1262 to 1274.

In 1269 he was captured by Conrad Von Matsch, lord of the castle of  Boffalora near Madesimo, and publicly exhibited in a cage at Sondalo in Valtellina. Napo's troops freed him and destroyed the castle on 25 September 1273.

A leading exponent of the Guelph (pro-papal) side in the struggle between papacy, the Holy Roman Emperor and the Italian communes, Raimondo was appointed as patriarch/lord of Aquileia on 21 December 1273. After the battle of Desio, the defeated members of the della Torre family took shelter under him in Friuli.

During his tenure as patriarch, he constantly warred against the nearby Republic of Venice, first in the conflict for Capodistria (1274–1279) and then for Trieste (1283–1291). After raising an army of some 45,000 infantry and 5,000 horsemen, he was able to storm the fortress of Moccò in 1289, and after the peace of Treviso (1291) he annexed Trieste to the patriarchate. He later pushed back an assault by the Da Camino of Treviso and suppressed several rebellions of his vassals. In 1297 he also quenched a rebellion of the counts of Gorizia.

Raimondo died in 1299 and was buried in the basilica of Aquileia.

References

External links
Biography at the Dizionario biografico italiano 

13th-century births
1299 deaths
Raimondo
Patriarchs of Aquileia
Archbishops of Milan
Bishops of Como